Bandović is a surname. Notable people with the surname include:

Božidar Bandović (born 1969), Montenegrin footballer and manager
Dejan Bandović (born 1983), Bosnia and Herzegovina footballer
Igor Bandović (born 1977), Serbian jurist
Ljubomir Bandović (born 1976), Serbian actor

Serbian surnames